Rotula deciesdigitatus is a species of echinoderm in the monotypic genus Rotula, belonging to the family Rotulidae.

The species is found in Europe and Western Africa.

References

Clypeasteroida
Animals described in 1778